Kirchgandern is a municipality in the district of Eichsfeld in Thuringia, Germany. It is part of the Verwaltungsgemeinschaft Hanstein-Rusteberg. Kirchgandern was first mentioned in documentary in 1118.

References

Eichsfeld (district)